Shane Keegan is an Irish football manager, he has been the manager of League of Ireland First Division side Cobh Ramblers F.C. since June 2022.

His departure from Wexford came in controversial circumstances as the news broke just before the away leg of a relegation play off to Drogheda which they subsequently lost after having been 2.0 up in the first leg.

Keegan's first season in charge of Galway United resulted in the club being relegated from the League of Ireland Premier Division. That same season he guided his side to the semi-final of the EA Sports Cup where they lost 3-0 to Dundalk. His side also made it to the quarter-finals of the FAI Cup but were beaten 2-1 by Limerick.
His contract with Galway was not renewed at the end of the two year term following a very disappointing season.

He resigned as manager one month later after a disastrous run of results.  

Keegan was appointed manager of League of Ireland First Division side Cobh Ramblers F.C. on 27 June 2022, on a contract until the end of the 2023 season.

Honours

Manager
Wexford Youths
League of Ireland First Division (1): 2015

Dundalk
President's Cup (1): 2021

References

Living people
League of Ireland managers
Galway United F.C. managers
Wexford F.C. managers
Dundalk F.C. managers
Cobh Ramblers F.C. managers
1981 births
Republic of Ireland football managers